David Adiele  is a Nigerian former footballer who played as a defender for the Nigeria national team at both the 1980 Summer Olympics and the 1980 African Cup of Nations.

External links
Sport Reference Profile

Living people
Africa Cup of Nations-winning players
Nigerian footballers
Nigeria international footballers
1980 African Cup of Nations players
Footballers at the 1980 Summer Olympics
Olympic footballers of Nigeria
1955 births
Association football defenders